Nicolas Kerdiles (born January 11, 1994) is an American former professional ice hockey forward. He played briefly in the National Hockey League (NHL) with the Anaheim Ducks. Kerdiles was selected by the Ducks in the second round (36th overall) of the 2012 NHL Entry Draft.

Playing career
Kerdiles moved to Irvine, California at the age of six where he learned and trained to play hockey. As a youth, he played in the 2007 Quebec International Pee-Wee Hockey Tournament with a minor ice hockey team from Los Angeles. He attended the University of Wisconsin–Madison where he played two seasons of NCAA Division I hockey with the Wisconsin Badgers. During his freshman season he led the Badgers to capture the Broadmoor Trophy as the WCHA playoff champion, and was recognized for his outstanding performance when he was voted the most valuable player of the 2013 WCHA Men's Ice Hockey Tournament.

On Apr 5, 2014, Kerdiles relinquished his final two seasons of NCAA eligibility to sign a three-year entry-level contract with the Anaheim Ducks of the National Hockey League. He made his professional debut with the Ducks American Hockey League affiliate, the Norfolk Admirals during the 2014 Calder Cup playoffs.

On February 22, 2017, Kerdiles became the first player raised in Orange County to play for the Anaheim Ducks in his NHL debut against the Boston Bruins. The club re-signed him to a one-year, two-way extension worth $650,000 on June 17, 2017.

As an impending restricted free agent, Kerdiles was traded by the Ducks to the Winnipeg Jets in exchange for Chase De Leo on June 30, 2018. He was later signed to a one-year, two-way contract with the Jets on August 21, 2018.

Personal life
Kerdiles was born in Lewisville, Texas to a French father and a French-Canadian mother. His first language was French, and he has two older sisters, both born in France. Shortly after his birth, his family moved to France before settling in Irvine, California when he was six years old.

Kerdiles began dating Savannah Chrisley, who stars in the reality television show Chrisley Knows Best in November 2017. They got engaged on December 24, 2018, but Chrisley announced in September 2020 that they had broken up.

Career statistics

Regular season and playoffs

International

Awards and honors

References

External links
 

1994 births
Living people
American men's ice hockey left wingers
American people of French descent
American people of French-Canadian descent
Anaheim Ducks draft picks
Anaheim Ducks players
Ice hockey players from California
Ice hockey people from Texas
Manitoba Moose players
Norfolk Admirals players
People from Lewisville, Texas
San Diego Gulls (AHL) players
Sportspeople from Irvine, California
USA Hockey National Team Development Program players
Wisconsin Badgers men's ice hockey players